John Barbour-James (June 1867 – 1954) was a black British activist who worked to improve the understanding and recognition of the achievements of black people in Britain.

Barbour James was born in British Guiana, where he became postmaster in Belfield in the 1890s. While living in British Guiana he established the self-help Victoria Belfield Agricultural Society which recognised the value of improving the diet and farming among the Afro-Guianese.

In 1902, he was transferred to the Gold Coast. His wife was not allowed to move to the Gold Cast. Barbour-James moved his family to London where he could more easy visit them. Later he moved to London where he founded the African Patriotic Intelligence Bureau in 1918. Barbour-James moved to the Caribbean in 1938, and died in Georgetown in 1954.

His daughter, Amy Barbour-James, was also a civil rights activist. She became the secretary of the League of Coloured Peoples in 1942.

References

1867 births
1954 deaths
People from Demerara-Mahaica
Guyanese activists
Guyanese emigrants to England
Afro-Guyanese people